Lee Dae-ro (born 12 March 1980) is a South Korean racewalker. He competed in the men's 20 kilometres walk at the 2004 Summer Olympics.

References

1980 births
Living people
Athletes (track and field) at the 2004 Summer Olympics
South Korean male racewalkers
Olympic athletes of South Korea
Place of birth missing (living people)